The Academy Award for Best Makeup and Hairstyling is the Academy Award given to the best achievement in makeup and hairstyling for film. Traditionally, three films have been nominated each year with exceptions in the early 1980s and 2002 when there were only two nominees; in 1999, when there were four nominees. Beginning with the 92nd Academy Awards, five films were nominated.

The competitive category was created in 1981 as the Academy Award for Best Makeup, after the Academy received complaints that the makeup work in The Elephant Man (1980) was not going to be honored. Although no award was given to The Elephant Man, an entire category dedicated to honoring makeup effects in film was created for subsequent ceremonies. Previously, makeup artists were only eligible for special achievement awards for their work.

Ahead of nominations, a shortlist of titles is chosen by the makeup branch's executive committee and clips are screened by the members of the branch at an annual "bake-off." After only two films were shortlisted in 2002, rules were installed requiring that seven finalists be chosen each year with the top three becoming nominees. Beginning in 2020, the shortlist expanded from seven finalists to ten.

In 2012, the category was given its current name for use in the 85th Academy Awards and onward. Makeup artist Rick Baker holds the record for both most wins (7) and most nominations (11) for this award.

Special Achievement Awards
Before 1981, Special Achievement Oscars were twice awarded to makeup artists for their work on a specific film:

 1964 – William J. Tuttle for 7 Faces of Dr. Lao 
 1968 – John Chambers for Planet of the Apes

Hairstylists
Starting in 1993, the award is to be shared with hairstylists if hair effects "contribute greatly to the appearance and effect of the characters".

Winners and nominees
In the following table, the years are listed as per Academy convention, and generally correspond to the year of film release; the ceremonies are always held the following year. Films in dark blue background have received a Special/Honorary Award; those in yellow background have won a regular Academy Award of Merit.

1960s

1980s

1990s

2000s

2010s

2020s

Shortlisted finalists
Finalists for Best Makeup & Hairstyling are selected by the Makeup & Hairstylists Branch. Ten films are shortlisted. Prior to the 92nd Academy Awards, up to seven films were shortlisted. The full membership of the Makeup & Hairstylists Branch is invited to view excerpts and is provided with supporting information at a "bake-off" where balloting determines the five nominees. These are the additional films that presented at the bake-off.

Multiple awards

7 wins
 Rick Baker

4 wins
 Greg Cannom

3 wins
 Ve Neill

2 wins
 David LeRoy Anderson
 Michèle Burke
 Mark Coulier
 Kazu Hiro (formerly known as Kazuhiro Tsuji)
 Yolanda Toussieng
 Richard Taylor

Multiple nominations

11 nominations
 Rick Baker

10 nominations
 Greg Cannom

8 nominations
 Ve Neill

6 nominations
 Michèle Burke

5 nominations
 Matthew W. Mungle

4 nominations
 Mark Coulier
 Joel Harlow
 Kazu Hiro (formerly known as Kazuhiro Tsuji)
 Aldo Signoretti
 Yolanda Toussieng
 Michael Westmore
 Stan Winston

3 nominations
 David LeRoy Anderson
 Bill Corso
 Naomi Donne
 Edouard F. Henriques
 Love Larson
 Martin Samuel
 Jenny Shircore
 Eva von Bahr
 Lisa Westcott

2 nominations
 Howard Berger
 Veronica Brebner
 Lois Burwell
 John Caglione Jr.
 Colleen Callaghan
 Judith A. Cory
 Patricia Dehaney
 Ken Diaz
 Dave Elsey
 Paul Engelen
 Carl Fullerton
 Bob Laden
 Tami Lane
 Göran Lundström
 Mike Marino
 Adrien Morot
 Conor O'Sullivan
 Christina Smith
 Dick Smith
 Vittorio Sodano
 Daniel C. Striepeke
 Peter Swords King
 Richard Taylor
 Arjen Tuiten
 David White

See also
 Saturn Award for Best Make-up
 BAFTA Award for Best Makeup and Hair
 Critics' Choice Movie Award for Best Makeup
 Make-Up Artists and Hair Stylists Guild Award for Best Contemporary Make-Up in a Feature-Length Motion Picture
 Make-Up Artists and Hair Stylists Guild Award for Best Special Make-Up Effects in a Feature-Length Motion Picture
 Make-Up Artists and Hair Stylists Guild Award for Best Contemporary Hair Styling in a Feature-Length Motion Picture

References

Makeup
 
Film awards for makeup and hairstyling